Çanakkale District (also: Merkez, meaning "central") is a district of the Çanakkale Province of Turkey. Its seat is the city of Çanakkale. Its area is 1,016 km2, and its population is 195,439 (2021).

Composition
There are two municipalities in Çanakkale District:
 Çanakkale
 Kepez

There are 52 villages in Çanakkale District:

 Akçalı
 Akçapınar
 Akçeşme
 Alanköy
 Aşağıokçular
 Belen
 Bodurlar
 Çamyayla
 Çiftlikdere
 Çınarlı
 Çıplak
 Civler
 Dedeler
 Denizgöründü
 Dümrek
 Elmacık
 Erenköy
 Gökçalı
 Güzelyalı
 Halileli
 Haliloğlu
 Işıklar
 Kalabaklı
 Kalafat
 Karacalar
 Karacaören
 Karapınar
 Kayadere
 Kemel
 Kızılcaören
 Kızılkeçili
 Kirazlı
 Kocalar
 Kumkale
 Kurşunlu
 Maraşal Fevzi Çakmak
 Musaköy
 Ortaca
 Ovacık
 Özbek
 Salihler
 Saraycık
 Sarıbeyli
 Sarıcaeli
 Serçiler
 Taşlıtarla
 Terziler
 Tevfikiye
 Ulupınar
 Yağcılar
 Yapıldak
 Yukarıokçular

References

Districts of Çanakkale Province